Maria Sharapova defeated Justine Henin-Hardenne in the final, 6–4, 6–4 to win the women's singles tennis title at the 2006 US Open. It was her second major title. She lost just one set during the tournament (to Amélie Mauresmo in the semifinals). By reaching the final, Henin-Hardenne became the eighth woman (after Maureen Connolly, Margaret Court, Chris Evert, Martina Navratilova, Steffi Graf, Monica Seles and Martina Hingis) to reach all four major finals in a calendar year.

Kim Clijsters was the reigning champion, but did not participate due to injury.

This marked the final major appearance of two-time major champion Mary Pierce, who lost to Li Na in the third round.

This marked the first major since the 1999 Australian Open where Serena Williams was unseeded. Needing a wild card to participate due to her ranking of world No. 139, Williams defeated top-20 players Daniela Hantuchová and Ana Ivanovic en route to the fourth round, where she was beaten by Amélie Mauresmo in three sets.

Seeds
The seeded players are listed below.

  Amélie Mauresmo (semifinals)
  Justine Henin-Hardenne (final)
  Maria Sharapova (champion)
  Elena Dementieva (quarterfinals)
  Nadia Petrova (third round)
  Svetlana Kuznetsova (fourth round)
  Patty Schnyder (fourth round)
  Martina Hingis (second round)
  Nicole Vaidišová (third round)
  Lindsay Davenport (quarterfinals)
  Anastasia Myskina (first round)
  Dinara Safina (quarterfinals)
  Mary Pierce (third round)
  Francesca Schiavone (third round)
  Anna-Lena Grönefeld (first round)
  Ana Ivanovic (third round)
  Daniela Hantuchová (second round)
  Flavia Pennetta (withdrew)
  Jelena Janković (semifinals)
  Maria Kirilenko (third round)
  Shahar Pe'er (fourth round)
  Katarina Srebotnik (third round)
  Anna Chakvetadze (fourth round)
  Li Na (fourth round)
  Anabel Medina Garrigues (first round)
  Marion Bartoli (third round)
  Tatiana Golovin (quarterfinals)
  Ai Sugiyama (third round)
  Zheng Jie (second round)
  Venus Williams (withdrew)
  Nathalie Dechy (first round)
  Elena Likhovtseva (third round)
  Vera Zvonareva (third round)

Qualifying

Draw

Finals

Top half

Section 1

Section 2

Section 3

Section 4

Bottom half

Section 5

Section 6

Section 7

Section 8

Championship match statistics

Notes and references

External links
2006 US Open – Women's draws and results at the International Tennis Federation

Women's Singles
US Open (tennis) by year – Women's singles
2006 in women's tennis
2006 in American women's sports